Zechariah 11 is the eleventh of the total 14 chapters in the Book of Zechariah in the Hebrew Bible or the Old Testament of the Christian Bible. This book contains the prophecies attributed to the prophet Zechariah, and is a part of the Book of the Twelve Minor Prophets. This chapter is a part of a section (so-called "Second Zechariah") consisting of Zechariah 9–14.

Text 
The original text was written in the Hebrew language. This chapter is divided into 17 verses.
 Continuation of the subject in the tenth chapter.

Textual witnesses
Some early manuscripts containing the text of this chapter in Hebrew are of the Masoretic Text, which includes the Codex Cairensis (from year 895), the Petersburg Codex of the Prophets (916), Aleppo Codex (930), and Codex Leningradensis (1008). Fragments containing parts of this chapter were found among the Dead Sea Scrolls, that is, 4Q82 (4QXIIg; 50–25 BCE) with extant verses 1–2.

There is also a translation into Koine Greek known as the Septuagint, made in the last few centuries BCE. Extant ancient manuscripts of the Septuagint version include Codex Vaticanus (B; B; 4th century), Codex Sinaiticus (S; BHK: S; 4th century), Codex Alexandrinus (A; A; 5th century) and Codex Marchalianus (Q; Q; 6th century).

Desolation of Israel (11:1–3)
These verses are forming a taunting song against the leadership of the people, or even the temple, alluding to Jeremiah 25:36. This section is a so-called 'link passage' with the 'stitch words': 'Lebanon' (cf 10:12; 11:1) and 'shepherds' (10:3; 11:3, 4). The passage
was interpreted to refer to the second temple after the destruction of that temple in AD 70.

Prophecy of the Shepherds (11:4–17)
In this section verses 4–6 introduce a prophet who plays a "shepherd" and is strongly identified with YHWH, with the people of Israel as the "flock", and their leaders as "merchants".

Verse 12
 And I said unto them,
 If ye think good, give me my price;
 and if not, forbear.
 So they weighed for my price thirty pieces of silver.
"My price": that is, "my wages" for taking care of the "flock", which represents "people".
 "If ye think good": literally, "If it be good in your eyes." Christian writers connect this to the ministry of Jesus, who had given pastoral care to the people, speaking of himself as a "servant" to fulfill the Father's will (Philippians 2:7).
 "If not, forbear": recalls the passages in the book of Ezekiel: "Thou shalt say unto them, thus saith the Lord God, He that heareth, let him hear, and he that forbeareth, let him forbear" (Ezekiel 3:27; cf. ,). Elijah had also said, "If the Lord be God, follow Him; but if Baal, then follow him" (1 Kings 18:21) indicating that God will not force the free-will of men.
 "Thirty pieces of silver": is the price of a slave, gored to death by an ox. This is connected to the bargain of Judas, which the high priest, knowingly or unknowingly, fixed on the price of "thirty pieces of silver." Bereshit Rabba notes that this prophecy 'belongs to the Messiah'.

Verse 13
And the Lord said to me, “Throw it to the potter”—that princely price they set on me. So I took the thirty pieces of silver and threw them into the house of the Lord for the potter.

This saying is attributed to Jeremiah (as a form of midrash on Jeremiah 18–19) in the New Testament (Matthew 27:3-10).

See also

Related Bible parts: Exodus 21, Jeremiah 32, Matthew 26, Matthew 27

Notes and references

Sources

External links

Jewish
Zechariah 11 Hebrew with Parallel English
Zechariah 11 Hebrew with Rashi's Commentary

Christian
Zechariah 11 English Translation with Parallel Latin Vulgate 

11